A potential debt-ceiling crisis in the United States began unfolding on January 19, 2023, when the United States hit its debt ceiling. It is part of an ongoing political debate in the United States Congress about federal government spending and the national debt.

In the United States, the debt ceiling is a limit on how much national debt that Congress lets the Treasury Department incur. Although it does not authorize new spending, it does give greater power to Treasury over financing what Congress has approved. Congress has increased the debt ceiling 78 times since 1960, 49 of those increases taking place when a Republican was president and the other 29 during a Democratic presidency.

In January 2013, the United States hit the debt ceiling, causing a crisis that persisted until that October, when the Continuing Appropriations Act of 2014 was signed into law by President Barack Obama. Since then, the debt ceiling has been increased multiple times, the most recent one a raising to $31.4 trillion in December 2021. The current crisis began when the U.S. hit that debt limit on January 19, 2023. In response, Treasury Secretary Janet Yellen informed leaders in the House and Senate that the Treasury had begun implementing "extraordinary measures," which it had indicated in a previous letter would be implemented when the debt ceiling was reached. However, though they were being used to prevent a default, they were expected to expire in a few months.

According to reports from Wells Fargo, if the United States does not raise the debt ceiling, the government will begin defaulting on its debts starting sometime between early July and early September. In that event, the Treasury would have to either default on payments to bondholders or immediately curtail payment of funds owed to various companies and individuals that had been mandated but not fully funded by Congress. Both situations would be expected to result in a global economic meltdown. Additionally, if the federal government was unable to issue new debt, it would be forced to impose budget cuts that, in total, would equal 5% of the size of the American economy.

Background

The deficit and the national debt

Federal budget and deficit 

In 2019, just over 60% of the federal budget went to mandatory spending for programs like Social Security, Medicare, and Medicaid, with another 30% going to discretionary spending (half of which went to defense). The remaining 9% went to pay for interest on the debt. Meanwhile, both mandatory spending programs and interest on the debt were expected to take up increasing shares of the federal budget, while tax revenues were expected to be stagnant. 

In the fiscal year 2022, the federal government brought in $4.90 trillion but spent $6.27 trillion, with a net budget deficit of $1.38 trillion (the fourth-highest of the 21st century). In addition, it has run deficits every year since 2001, when it last ran a surplus. Financing a deficit requires that the government borrow money. 

However, based on Article 1, Section 8, Clause 2 of the United States Constitution, only Congress has the authority to borrow money "on the Credit of the United States".

Debt ceiling 

The United States debt ceiling is a legislative limit that determines how much debt the Treasury Department may incur. It was introduced in 1917, when Congress voted to give Treasury the right to issue bonds for financing America participating in World War I, rather than issuing them for individual projects, as had been the case in the past. In 1939, Congress gave the Treasury the right to issue and manage debt—though it limited how much it could issue. From 1939 to 2018, the Treasury increased the debt ceiling 98 times, decreasing it five times.Whilst the Treasury can borrow money to pay for federal expenditures, it is limited in power by Congress.

In other words, the Treasury can borrow money to pay for federal expenditures—but only as much as Congress lets it.

National debt 

Since 2009, America's national debt has nearly tripled, with annual federal deficits averaging close to $1 trillion since 2001. During the 21st century, it has gone up for various reasons, including tax cuts under Presidents Bush and Trump, wars in Iraq and Afghanistan, entitlements like Medicare Part D, and spending in response to the Great Recession and the COVID-19 pandemic. Currently, the U.S. is the industrialized country with the second highest debt-to-GDP ratio, behind Japan. Additionally, as a result of the pandemic, the national debt is forecast to be double the United States' GDP by 2051.

Reducing the deficit and debt 
According to both policy experts and politicians, dealing with the deficit and debt will ultimately involve both raising taxes and decreasing spending. Past plans for taxes hikes have included reducing the number of deductions, increasing rates on higher earners, and making new taxes, while proposals for reducing spending have included reducing Social Security benefits, lowering payments for Medicaid and Medicare, and cutting defense spending, among others.

However, it tends to be difficult to do so in practice, owing to citizens' reluctancy to alter large programs like Social Security. Historically, no political party has been willing to reduce the deficit or debt when they have held power, although the issue is often a foundation of candidates' election campaigns.

The U.S. dollar and borrowing 
The United States dollar (used heavily in international trade) is considered to be the world's reserve currency for a variety of reasons, including how large the American economy is, America's geopolitical strength, the dollar's relative stability, and the market for U.S. debt. As a result, foreign creditors (including China, Japan, and the United Kingdom) are large markets for the currency. This makes it easier for the U.S. government to finance the national debt, via being charged lower interest rates for borrowing money.

Reactions

Congress and the president
The House of Representatives and the White House disagree on how to resolve this crisis. House Speaker Kevin McCarthy (R-CA) has called for negotiations to reduce federal spending in exchange for increasing the debt ceiling, including making possible cuts to Medicare, Medicaid, and Social Security, or otherwise possibly overhauling entitlements. In contrast, the Biden administration has declared that raising the debt ceiling is non-negotiable, and that Congress is obligated to increase it. Senate Minority Leader Mitch McConnell (R-KY) has said that there will be no default, though he has also said that dealing with the debt ceiling will be up to President Biden and Speaker McCarthy.

Treasury Department

Secretary Yellen's comments 
Treasury Secretary Janet Yellen told the Associated Press that, while she expected that Congress would eventually raise the debt ceiling, demanding spending cuts in exchange for doing so would be irresponsible and that increasing it was about ensuring that the federal government could pay for spending that Congress had already approved, rather than about new spending. Yellen made similar points in her January 13, 2023, letter to Congress, also warning that if they did not suspend or raise it, they would harm the American economy, the American people, and the global financial system's stability.

"Extraordinary measures" 	
As a result of reaching the debt ceiling, the Treasury Department began considering implementation of "extraordinary measures" to prevent a default for a few months, so as to give Congress time to increase the debt ceiling, explained in a memo it issued on January 19, 2023. However, it would only be able to use them for a few months. Extraordinary measures are accounting maneuvers that the Treasury uses to enable the federal government to continue to meet its various financial obligations while there is an impasse over the debt ceiling. Said measures were first used by it in 1985, and Congress granted the Treasury permission to continue using them the following year.

Secretary Yellen also initiated a "debt issuance suspension period" through June 5, and has rejected the minting of a trillion-dollar coin (which would have created $1 trillion in seigniorage).

Markets 
Analysts were monitoring the ongoing debate over raising the debt ceiling, and were keeping investors informed of it and similarly warning about the potential consequences of a default. However, as of January 23, 2023, markets were not reacting to the debt ceiling debate, as the expectation was that the debt ceiling would be raised in time to prevent default. Analysts wrote that, with the exception of the 2011 debt ceiling crisis, markets had historically not reacted to debates over raising it. On the other hand, they wrote that if the debt ceiling wasn't increased as the deadline for doing so drew nearer, stock prices would start dropping and interest rates would begin to rise.

Responses and analysis

Comparisons to the 2011 debt ceiling crisis 

The Associated Press has noted similarities between the 2023 debt ceiling crisis and the one in 2011, including how both involved the GOP-controlled House of Representatives demanding spending cuts in exchange for increasing the debt limit.

In 2011, both the House and the Obama Administration negotiated for months on it until talks collapsed. As a result, markets experienced turmoil, with the S&P 500 dropping by over 16% in the final month before the deadline. In August 2011, two days before the government would have defaulted, there was a compromise between Democrats and Senate Republicans to create a committee to look into cutting spending, and to also increase the debt ceiling. As a result of the near-default, America's credit rating was downgraded to AA+ by Standard and Poor's, as American borrowing costs went up by $1.3 billion that year.

Potential consequences of a default 
Increasing political polarization since 2011 has made votes to raise the debt ceiling more contentious than before, with economists now considering what would happen if the federal government defaulted on its loans. One analysis from September 2021 (during a previous debt limit standoff) said that, if the federal government defaulted, America's credit rating would experience a drastic downgrade, interest rates on Treasury bonds would go up sharply, interest rates both in the U.S. and worldwide would spike, and payments on benefits (such as social security) and salaries for the military would be stopped. Other potential consequences of a default would include reduced consumer confidence, a recession, immediately stopping about 10% of the American economy, increasing the cost of a 30-year mortgage, losing three million jobs in the U.S., and increasing the national debt due to higher interest rates.

Moody's Analytics warned that Congress may not be able to avoid breaching the debt limit. This warning was based on both the difficulty the House had in electing Kevin McCarthy as Speaker, and how some lawmakers (mostly Republican) were wondering if the Treasury would be able to prioritize paying bondholders if it was breached.

Potential ways of raising the debt ceiling

General methods 
Market analysts have discussed some ways the government could increase the debt limit, such as the House and Senate negotiating on it, Representatives using a discharge petition to force the House to vote on raising it (though they warned that the process for making one took time), prioritizing paying bondholders before paying other bills (though it would hurt some people, and might not be possible), the Treasury minting a platinum coin worth $1 trillion and using it to pay debts (though it would not be workable in this case), Treasury issuing a different type of bond (though it would take time to roll out and would increase interest payments, plus using it would likely lead to higher interest rates), and President Biden invoking the 14th Amendment (though it would spark a constitutional crisis, plus a recession might result). Senator Joe Manchin has suggested that raising it could be coupled with a commission to both strengthen the Medicare and Social Security trust funds while also reducing U.S. debt.

Using the 14th Amendment to end the debt ceiling crisis 
In an op-ed for The New York Times, historian Eric Foner wrote that President Joe Biden had the ability to end the crisis by avoiding Congress altogether, citing the Fourteenth Amendment to the United States Constitution, which established that the "validity of the public debt of the United States, authorized by law, including debts incurred for payment of pensions and bounties for services in suppressing insurrection or rebellion, shall not be questioned". However, legal scholars were divided as to whether or not it would be legally permissible for President Biden to do that. Additionally, there was concern that, were the president to do so, the courts might not accept it.

See also
 1995–1996 United States federal government shutdowns, which included a dispute about the debt ceiling
 2011 United States debt-ceiling crisis 
 2013 United States debt ceiling crisis

References

2023 in economics
2023 in the United States
Economy of the United States
United States federal budgets
Government finances in the United States
Presidency of Joe Biden